Ramón Quadreny (1892–1961) was a Spanish film director and actor. He directed the 1942 smuggling thriller Blood in the Snow.

Selected filmography

Director
 Blood in the Snow (1942)
 The Big Show (1960)

Actor
 Juan José (1917)
 Closed Exit (1955)

Editor
 Under the Skies of the Asturias (1951)
 The Dance of the Heart (1953)
 One Bullet Is Enough (1954)
 The Louts (1954)

References

Bibliography 
 Bentley, Bernard. A Companion to Spanish Cinema. Boydell & Brewer 2008.

External links 
 

1892 births
1961 deaths
Spanish film directors
Spanish male film actors
Male actors from Barcelona
20th-century Spanish male actors